The Mask Singer Indonesia is an Indonesian reality singing competition television series based on the Masked Singer franchise which originated from the South Korean version of the show King of Mask Singer. It premiered on GTV on 18 October 2017, and is hosted by John Martin Tumbel.

Season 1
Season 1 came out on 18 October 2017. It ended on 10 January 2018.

Episodes

Episode 1 (18 Oct)

Episode 2 (24 Oct)

Episode 3 (1 Nov)

Episode 4 (8 Nov)

Episode 5 (15 Nov)

Episode 6 (22 Nov)

Episode 7 (29 Nov)

Episode 8 (6 Dec)

Episode 9 (13 Dec)

Episode 10 (20 Dec)

Episode 11 (27 Dec)

Episode 12 (3 Jan)

Episode 13 (10 Jan)
 Group performance: "Kangen" by Dewa 19

Season 2

Notes

References

External links
 

2017 Indonesian television series debuts
GTV (Indonesian TV network) original programming
2010s Indonesian television series
2020s Indonesian television series
Indonesian-language television shows
Indonesian television series based on South Korean television series
Masked Singer